Anthanassa argentea, the chestnut crescent, is a species of crescents, checkerspots, anglewings, etc. in the butterfly family Nymphalidae. It is found in North America.

The MONA or Hodges number for Anthanassa argentea is 4479.

References

Further reading

 

Melitaeini
Articles created by Qbugbot
Butterflies described in 1882